Lakeyta Bonnette-Bailey is an American academic who specializes in popular culture and African American studies. She is the author of Pulse of the People: Political Rap Music and Black Politics (2016), and teaches in the department of political sciences at Georgia State University.

Biography
Lakeyta Bonnette-Bailey, born Lakeyta Moninque Bonnette, did her BA at Winthrop University and received her Ph.D. from Ohio State University, where she studied the role of rap music in African American politics.

Her monograph Pulse of the People: Political Rap Music and Black Politics was published by U of Pennsylvania P in 2016. The book investigates the influence of rap music on political views and attitudes among African Americans, paying particular attention to political hip hop.

References

Living people
Year of birth missing (living people)